The Cessna Citation Latitude is a business jet built by Cessna.
The Model 680A was announced at the 2011 NBAA convention, the prototype first flew on 18 February 2014, it achieved FAA certification on June 5, 2015, and first deliveries began on August 27.

It retains the  Model 680 Sovereign wing, twin P&WC PW306D turbofans and cruciform tail and adds a new stand-up circular fuselage with a flat floor, which was kept in the stretched, re-winged, and re-engined Cessna Citation Longitude.

Development

The $14.9 million Citation Latitude was announced by Cessna at the annual NBAA convention in October 2011, between the $12.6 million Citation XLS+ and the $17.5 million Citation Sovereign.
The prototype first flew on 18 February 2014 in Wichita, Kansas.
Cessna announced on June 5, 2015, that it had achieved FAA certification for the type.
On August 27, 2015, Cessna announced the first deliveries had begun.
In 2022, its equipped price was $19.305M.

Design

It keeps the Citation Sovereign wing, twin Pratt & Whitney Canada PW306D turbofans and cruciform tail.
Its newly-designed all-metal stand-up circular fuselage has a flat floor and seats nine.

Typical missions are 2.0–2.7 hours and with  block speeds and most operators can fly 5–6 hours at Mach 0.72–0.76 for a 2,000–2,400 nmi range, with short takeoff requirements and good hot and high performance.
A first hour fuel burn of  followed by  the second hour and fuel burn can reach  for a 2-hour trip with favorable conditions.
It lists for $17.5–18 million typically equipped, the same as the Embraer Legacy 450 with a similar flat floor cabin for club four plus two chairs and over 200 miles more range,  higher cruise and fly-by-wire controls.
Embraer is firm on list price while Textron discounts the Latitude by up to 20% for $13.5–14 million to sell three times as many aircraft.

Operational history

Deliveries to customers began in the third quarter of 2015 and sixteen had been handed over by the end of the year.
By May 2018, almost three years since introduction, 124 were delivered and logged 80,000 flight hours.

In June 2018, of 129 delivered,  were in the US, three in Mexico, two each are based in China, France and Turkey, and there was one each in Chile, Paraguay, the Philippines, Poland, Scotland and Switzerland.
It is used by medium-size corporations, typically flying 200–300 hours per year, and large fleet operators, the largest being NetJets which booked 25 firm orders and 125 options in 2012 and received 44 aircraft for its U.S. operations and 10 for Europe by June 2018, flying theirs over 1,000 hours per year.
By mid-September, the 136 delivered have logged 115,000 flight hours, and Textron claims it outsells the competition by four to one.

Specifications (Citation Latitude)

See also

References

External links

 
 
 

Citation Latiude
2010s United States business aircraft
Twinjets
Low-wing aircraft
Latitude
Cruciform tail aircraft
Aircraft first flown in 2014